Paramount Restaurants was a chain restaurant operator in the United Kingdom. It was formerly known as Groupe Chez Gérard. It operated in 52 locations using several brands:

Bertorelli
Brasserie Gérard
Caffè Uno (acquired 2005)
Chez Gérard
Il Bertorelli
Livebait

In November 2011 the company went into administration.

References

Restaurant groups in the United Kingdom